Limaria pellucida, the Antillean file shell, is a species of bivalve mollusc in the family Limidae. It can be found along the Atlantic coast of North America, ranging from North Carolina to the West Indies.

References

 Turgeon, D. D., W. G. Lyons, P. Mikkelsen, G. Rosenberg, and F. Moretzsohn. 2009. Bivalvia (Mollusca) of the Gulf of Mexico, Pp. 711–744 in Felder, D.L. and D.K. Camp (eds.), Gulf of Mexico–Origins, Waters, and Biota. Biodiversity. Texas A&M Press, Colleg
 Huber, M. (2010). Compendium of bivalves. A full-color guide to 3,300 of the world's marine bivalves. A status on Bivalvia after 250 years of research. Hackenheim: ConchBooks. 901 pp., 1 CD-ROM. 
 Cosel R. von & Gofas S. (2019). Marine bivalves of tropical West Africa: from Rio de Oro to southern Angola. Faune et Flore Tropicales. 48: 1-1104.

External links
 Adams, C. B. (1848). Descriptions of undescribed species of shells, from the island of Jamaica. Proceedings of the Boston Society of Natural History. 2: 102-103
  Census of Marine Life (2012). SYNDEEP: Towards a first global synthesis of biodiversity, biogeography and ecosystem function in the deep sea. Unpublished data (datasetID: 3),

Limidae